The following lists cover state and non-state primary and secondary schools in Queensland, Australia.

South-East Queensland
There are 4 lists of schools for South-East Queensland:

 List of schools in Greater Brisbane
 List of schools in Gold Coast, Queensland
 List of schools in Sunshine Coast, Queensland
 List of schools in West Moreton

Rest of Queensland 

Outside of South-East Queensland, there are 5 lists of schools in the rest of Queensland:
 List of schools in Darling Downs
 List of schools in Wide Bay-Burnett
 List of schools in Central Queensland
 List of schools in North Queensland
 List of schools in Far North Queensland

See also 
 Lists of schools in Australia
 List of universities in Australia
 Private schools
 Great Public Schools Association of Queensland Inc.
 Associated Independent Colleges
 The Associated Schools
 Queensland Grammar Schools
 Presbyterian and Methodist Schools Association